The Salem Prize, in memory of Raphael Salem, is awarded each year to young researchers for outstanding contributions to the field of analysis. It is awarded by the School of Mathematics at the Institute for Advanced Study in Princeton  and was founded by the widow of Raphael Salem in his memory. The prize is considered highly prestigious and many Fields Medalists previously received it. The prize was 5000 French Francs in 1990.

Past winners
(Note: a F symbol denotes mathematicians who later earned a Fields Medal).

See also

 List of mathematics awards

References

Mathematics awards